Elachista regificella is a moth of the family Elachistidae, with a restricted distribution in Europe.

Description
Adults are on wing in July in one generation per year.

The larvae feed on greater wood-rush (Luzula sylvatica) mining the leaves of their host plant. Young larvae create a very narrow mine running parallel to the midrib. The mine then suddenly widens to almost the full width of the leaf. The frass is deposited in the transition area between the mine types. Pupation takes place outside of the mine. They are greenish black with a pale honey coloured head. Larvae can be found from autumn to mid-June of the following year.

Distribution
The moth has been found in Great Britain and Romania. It might also occur in the Netherlands.

References

regificella
Leaf miners
Moths described in 1849
Moths of Europe
Taxa named by John Sircom